Westbury is a town in the central north of Tasmania, Australia.  It lies 30 km west of Launceston on the Bass Highway, and at the  had a population of 2,272. It is part of, and the headquarters of, the Meander Valley Council area.

Westbury's largest employer is Tasmanian Alkaloids, a company that specialises in the processing of poppies for pharmaceutical products. Other large employers are the Meander Valley Council, Tasmanian Aquaculture and the local Primary School.

The town of Westbury uses its location, within 2 hours drive of most tourist attractions in north and north west Tasmania, and its heritage buildings and scenery to promote the concept of Westbury as a unique place for tourists to stay in Northern Tasmania.

Westbury has a range of accommodation providers from high quality bed and breakfast style, colonial inn style and country hotel style.

The St Patrick's Festival is a major annual cultural activity that celebrates the historical links with Westbury and its early Irish community. The Festival celebrates via song and dance as well as a street parade and other family activities

On 30 September 2019 Westbury was named as the preferred location for the new Northern Tasmanian prison. The original site for the prison has since been abandoned and a new site further from Westbury is under investigation.

History
The site was first surveyed in 1823. The town was laid out in 1828 by the Van Diemen's Land Company.  In the 1830s Westbury developed as a garrison village. A detachment of troops commanded by Lieutenant Ball were stationed in Westbury in 1832. They were barracked around a village green in the centre of the town. The village green is still in use today and is claimed by the local community to be the only traditional English style village green in Australia. Westbury Post Office opened on 21 June 1832.

From early in the 19th century the village green has been the site for the Westbury St Patrick’s Festival celebrating the town’s Celtic links. Though Westbury is often described as a very "English village", the first European settlers were predominantly Irish; ex Irish convicts, retired soldiers and free settlers, many fleeing the Great Irish Famine in the 1840s. Gaelic was the local language in Westbury for many generations and a strong Irish brogue is reputed to have lasted throughout the 19th century.

Military pensioners were each granted a  block of land complete with a well and pear tree. By the mid-1800s Westbury had become the largest military community in Tasmania. The town had a population of some 3,000 and an extensive grid street plan was surveyed preparing Westbury to become the predominant town in the north of Tasmania and the gateway to the north-west, but Deloraine has filled that role instead.  Westbury remains a small town servicing the local agriculture industry.

The Westbury Primary School services the local community; students finishing primary school travel to Launceston or Deloraine to attend secondary education.

Westbury is named after Westbury, Wiltshire in England.

Local tourism attractions 

 Pearn's Steam World which is a collection of over 200 historic items.
 Westbury Maze and Tea Rooms.
 The White House.
 The Westbury Village Green.
 The Giant Cricket Stumps erected as a welcome gate to the cricket club.

External links 

 Westbury Tasmania website
 Tasmanian Government Tourism website
  Westbury Primary School website
 Westbury St Patrick's Festival website

References

Localities of Meander Valley Council
Towns in Tasmania